Mewatha Beach is a summer village in Alberta, Canada. It is located on the western shore of Skeleton Lake, east of Boyle.

Demographics 

In the 2016 Census of Population conducted by Statistics Canada, the Summer Village of Mewatha Beach had a population of 90 living in 48 of its 177 total private dwellings, a  change from its 2011 population of 79.

See also 
List of communities in Alberta
List of summer villages in Alberta
List of resort villages in Saskatchewan

References

External links 

1978 establishments in Alberta
Summer villages in Alberta